Boris Sergeevich Sheremetev (Борис Сергеевич Шереметев; 1822–1906) was a Russian composer. His best known work today is the setting of Pushkin's poem "I Loved You", which has been recorded by artists including Dmitri Hvorostovsky.

Works
 "I Loved You" ("Я Вас любил") on words by Pushkin

References

Russian composers
Russian male composers
1822 births
1906 deaths
19th-century male musicians